Róbert Antal (Former name: Róbert Adler, July 21, 1921 – February 1, 1995) was a Hungarian water polo player who competed in the 1952 Summer Olympics.

Antal, who was Jewish, was born in Budapest and died in Toronto, Canada.

Antal was part of the Hungarian team which won the gold medal in the 1952 tournament. He played two matches.

See also
 Hungary men's Olympic water polo team records and statistics
 List of Olympic champions in men's water polo
 List of Olympic medalists in water polo (men)
 List of men's Olympic water polo tournament goalkeepers
 List of select Jewish water polo players

References

External links
 

1921 births
1995 deaths
Hungarian male water polo players
Water polo goalkeepers
Olympic water polo players of Hungary
Water polo players at the 1952 Summer Olympics
Olympic gold medalists for Hungary
Olympic medalists in water polo
Medalists at the 1952 Summer Olympics
Hungarian Jews
Jewish water polo players
Water polo players from Budapest
Hungarian expatriates in Canada
20th-century Hungarian people